On October 4, 2017 around 8:07 PM local time, an extremely bright meteoroid fell over the northern Yunnan province of China, reaching maximum brightness roughly  above the ground. The 8-second superbolide was widely recorded, as it fell in the late evening on the Mid-Autumn Festival, a fairly popular festival in China.

Overview

While it was only the 5th most energetic impact event of 2017, it was the largest one to occur over land, and a populated area no less.

References

2017 in China
Modern Earth impact events
Meteoroids
2017 in space
October 2017 events in China